Manchester is a city in Northwest England.  The M9 postcode area is to the north of the city centre and includes the districts of Blackley and Harpurhey.  
This postcode area contains 15 listed buildings that are recorded in the National Heritage List for England.  Of these, one is listed at Grade II*, the middle of the three grades, and the others are at Grade II, the lowest grade.  The area is residential, and the listed buildings include houses, churches, a pillar box, a statue, a former public baths and laundry, a war memorial, and a crematorium.


Key

Buildings

References

Citations

Sources

Lists of listed buildings in Greater Manchester
Buildings and structures in Manchester